Jamie Donoughue is an Oscar® nominated British film director, producer and writer. Known for directing short-film Shok that earned him critical praise and multiple international awards including an Academy Award for Best Live Action Short Film nomination at the 88th Academy Awards. In 2016 he went onto direct two episodes of the BBC / Netflix drama The Last Kingdom. This was followed by a new Netflix original series entitled The Innocents, the series finale of ITV's Endeavour and lead director for the concluding series of A Discovery of Witches for Sky Max / AMC.

Filmography

Television

References

External links
 

Living people
American film directors
American film producers
Year of birth missing (living people)